is a best-of-indies album by the Japanese girl group Shiritsu Ebisu Chugaku (also called Ebichu for short). It was released on November 21, 2012 on the Sony Music Entertainment Japan's label Defstar Records.

Background 
The album is primarily a complete collection of the songs from Shiritsu Ebisu Chugaku's six indie singles. It also contains five tracks that were not released on CD before: "Ebiture", "Ebichū Shusseki Bangō no Uta Sono 1", "Isshō Tomodachi", "Mata Ashita", "Yakusoku". The first track, titled "Ebiture", is a warm-up opening number that starts Ebichu's concerts.

Track listing

Bonuses 
 First press
 A trading card randomly selected from 9 kinds
 Ticket for a buyer-selectable lottery
 Award Ē: TBA
 Award Bī: Signing event ticket
 Store benefits
 A poster featuring covers of the group's indie singles

Charts

References

External links 
 Indies' best "Ebichū no Zeppan Best: Owaranai Seishun" release announcement - Shiritsu Ebisu Chugaku Official Site

Shiritsu Ebisu Chugaku albums
2012 greatest hits albums
Defstar Records compilation albums